The three-striped roofed turtle (Batagur dhongoka) is a species of turtle in the family Geoemydidae. The species is endemic to South Asia.

Geographic range
The three-striped roofed turtle is found in Bangladesh, India (Assam, Bihar, Madhya Pradesh, Rajasthan, Uttar Pradesh, West Bengal), and possibly in Nepal.

References

Bibliography

Further reading
Gray JE (1835). Illustrations of Indian Zoology, Chiefly Selected from the Collection of Major-General Hardwicke. Vol. II. London (1833–1834): Adolphus Richter and Co. / Parbury, Allen and Co. 263 pp., 95 plates. (Emys dhongoka, new species, plate 60).

External links

Reptiles of India
Batagur
Reptiles described in 1832
Taxa named by John Edward Gray